Belomantis is a genus of mantis in the family Toxoderidae. It contains the following three species:
Belomantis helenae
Belomantis mirei
Belomantis occidentalis

See also
List of mantis genera and species

References

Toxoderidae
Mantodea genera